The Koniambo Massif is a mountain range near the town of Voh on the west coast of the North Province of New Caledonia, a French territory in the south-west Pacific Ocean. It is the site of a large nickel mine.

Important Bird Areas
A 12,000 ha tract of largely forested land encompassing the Koniambo Massif has been identified by BirdLife International as the Koniambo Massif Important Bird Area (IBA) because it is a breeding site for an estimated 200–400 pairs of burrow-nesting Tahiti Petrels. Potential threats to the birds come from a suite of invasive species, including rodents, feral pigs and cats, as well as from mining operations and disorientation from light pollution.

Potential threats in this area include fishing and marine pollution.

References

Important Bird Areas of New Caledonia
Mountains of New Caledonia
Seabird colonies